Sablale is a town in the southeastern Lower Shabelle region of Somalia. The broader Sablale District has a total population of 143,055 residents. The majority of Sablale residents are Dabarre sub-division of the wider Digil Rahanweyn Somalis.

Notes

References
Sablale

Populated places in Lower Shebelle